Vacha is a former Verwaltungsgemeinschaft in the district Wartburgkreis in Thuringia, Germany. The seat of the Verwaltungsgemeinschaft was in Vacha. It was disbanded on 31 December 2013.

The Verwaltungsgemeinschaft Vacha consisted of the following municipalities:

 Martinroda 
 Vacha 
 Völkershausen 
 Wölferbütt

Former Verwaltungsgemeinschaften in Thuringia